Launceston North and North Petherwin is an electoral division of Cornwall in the United Kingdom and returns one member to sit on Cornwall Council. The current Councillor is Adam Paynter, an Independent and the council's Deputy Leader.

Extent
Launceston North and North Petherwin covers the very north of the town of Launceston, including parts of the suburbs of St Stephen-by-Launceston and Lanstephan (which are both shared with Launceston Central division), as well as the villages of Yeolmbridge, Egloskerry, Langore, North Petherwin, Bennacott and Boyton, and the hamlets of Dutson, Ladycross, Kestle, Tregeare, Trebeath, Badharlick, Langdon, Hellescott, Billacott, Troswell, Brazacott, North Beer, Clubworthy, South Wheatley and Maxworthy. The village of Tregadillett is shared with the Stokeclimsland division. The division covers 10,233 hectares in total.

Election results

2017 election

2013 election

References

Launceston, Cornwall
Electoral divisions of Cornwall Council